The 1966 season of the Venezuelan Primera División, the top category of Venezuelan football, was played by 9 teams. The national champions were Deportivo Italia.

Results

Standings

External links
Venezuela 1966 season at RSSSF

Ven
Venezuelan Primera División seasons
1966 in Venezuelan sport